Mili Poljičak (born 13 July 2004) is a Croatian tennis player.

Poljičak has a career high ATP singles ranking of World No. 500 achieved on 17 October 2022. He also has a career high ATP doubles ranking of World No. 292 achieved on 3 October 2022.

Career
Poljičak made his ATP main draw debut at the 2021 Croatia Open Umag after receiving a wildcard into the doubles main draw. Partnering with Admir Kalender, the pair defeated 2nd seed Pablo Cuevas and Fabrice Martin in the first round in straight sets but lost in the next round to eventual champions Fernando Romboli and David Vega Hernández in three sets.

At the 2022 Zagreb Open he reached his maiden Challenger final as a wildcard where he lost to Filip Misolic. At the same tournament also as a wildcard he reached the semifinals in doubles partnering Antonio Šančić. As a result he reached the top 550 at World No. 549 (up 923 positions) in the singles rankings and the top 375 in doubles (up 88 positions) on 16 May 2022.

Challenger and World Tennis Tour Finals

Singles: 2 (1–1)

Junior Grand Slam finals

Singles: 1 (1 title)

Doubles: 1 (1 title)

References

External links

2004 births
Living people
Croatian male tennis players
French Open junior champions
Grand Slam (tennis) champions in boys' doubles
Tennis players from Split, Croatia
21st-century Croatian people